Measure of a Man is the debut album by American singer Clay Aiken. It was released on October 14, 2003 through RCA Records, five months after the conclusion of the second season of American Idol.

Measure of a Man was supported by three singles: "Invisible", ""The Way"/"Solitaire", and "I Will Carry You". The album received generally mixed reviews from critics. The album debuted at number one on the US Billboard 200 chart, selling 613,000 copies in its first week. The album also held the number one spot for two consecutive weeks. It was certified 
double platinum by the Recording Industry Association of America (RIAA) in November 2003.

Promotion

Singles 
"Invisible" is the first single from the album. It was initially released as a promo-only single in September 2003, and only became available as digital downloads much later.  It peaked at number eight on the US Billboard Adult Contemporary and at number 37 on the US Billboard Hot 100 charts on January 6, 2004. The single was certified gold for digital downloads by the RIAA on March 31, 2006.

"The Way"/"Solitaire" was released as the album second single on March 16, 2004. "The Way" peaked at number one on the Canadian Singles Chart.
 
"I Will Carry You" is the third single and peaked at number 25 on the US Billboard Adult Contemporary chart.

Music videos
The music video for "Invisible", directed by Diane Martel, was shot in Hollywood at Hollywood & Highland, a major outdoor shopping center and tourist attraction.  Aiken invited 800 fans to be part of the crowd scene in the video.

"The Way" music video was also directed by Diane Martel.  Instead of the traditional Hollywood types Aiken hired everyday people to play the couples shown in this video.

Critical reception 

Wade Paulsen of Reality TV World wrote that despite huge sales "Critics have ranged from strongly positive (Billboard) to mixed (Washington Post, which calls the CD a "likable album even without being a particularly good one", and Knight-Ridder), to negative (Associated Press, which refers to the song selections as "insipid"), to scathingly negative (the New York Daily News). "

Awards and nominations

Commercial performance
Measure of a Man debuted at number one on the US Billboard 200 chart, selling 613,000 copies in its first week. This became Aiken's first US number one debut. This was also the highest-selling debut for a solo artist since Snoop Dogg's Doggystyle in December 1993. In its second week, the album remained at number one on the chart, selling an additional 225,000 copies. In its third week, the album fell to number three on the chart, selling 141,000 more copies. In its fourth week, the album fell to number eight on the chart, selling 113,000 copies, bringing its four-week total to 1.1 million copies. On November 17, 2003, the album was certified double platinum by the Recording Industry Association of America (RIAA) for shipments of over two million copies. As of February 2011, the album has sold 2.8 million copies in the United States.

Track listing

In the summer of 2004, a second version of the album was released in which "Solitaire" (Neil Sedaka / Phil Cody) replaced "This is the Night" as a bonus cut.

In some of the international releases, the bonus track, "This is the Night" was replaced by "Bridge Over Troubled Water". The album released in Japan also included "On the Wings of Love" as a second bonus track.

Charts

Weekly charts

Year-end charts

Certifications

References 

2003 debut albums
Albums produced by Clive Davis
Clay Aiken albums
RCA Records albums
19 Recordings albums